Prokhorovsky (masculine), Prokhorovskaya (feminine), or Prokhorovskoye (neuter) may refer to:
Prokhorovsky District, a district of Belgorod Oblast, Russia
Prokhorovsky (rural locality), a rural locality (a settlement) in Pochepsky District of Bryansk Oblast, Russia
Prokhorovskoye, a rural locality (a village) in Yaroslavsky District of Yaroslavl Oblast, Russia